Assam Homoeopathic Medical College And Hospital, Nagaon is located in Nagaon, Assam. The institute was established in the year 1968. It is the first homoeopathic medical college of North East India.

History
The college was started on 15 August 1968 in the Haiborgaon Girl's High School, Haiborgaon, Nagaon. After a piece of land had been donated by  Meghraj Agarwalla, later on was shifted to Haibargaon, Nagaon. The foundation stone of the present building was laid on 29 November 1972 by Dr. Jogesh Mahanta the then Principal of Gauhati Medical College and Hospital. In 1978, the college became the first homoeopathic teaching institution in Assam to have been recognised by the Board of Homoeopathic System of Medicine, Assam. On 1 July 1988, the college has been undertaken by the Director of Medical Education, Planning & Research, Assam.

From the year 1968 the college was offering  homoeopathic Diploma course (DHMS) and from 2000 Degree course (BHMS) in homoeopathic Medicine has been introduced. The college is under  Srimanta Sankaradeva University of Health Sciences since 2011.

Academics
The college offers  5 and a half year Bachelor of Homoeopathic Medicine and Surgery(BHMS) degree course under Srimanta Sankaradeva University of Health Sciences.  In 2016, the admission into this college is based on Assam Combined Entrance Examination(Assam-CEE) conducted by Dibrugarh University
The intake capacity of the college is 50 students per batch.

References

External links
 Official Website

Colleges in Assam
Nagaon
Homeopathic colleges
Educational institutions established in 1968
1968 establishments in Assam